, originally known as  is a Japanese manga written and illustrated by Shinichi Kuruma. It was serialized in the Tokuma Shoten magazine Monthly Shōnen Captain infrequently between the May 1986 and August 1989 issues. Originally released in four tankōbon (bound volumes), Battle Royal High School was later re-released in two larger volumes on December 20, 2008.

The manga was adapted into an original video animation (OVA) anime feature on December 10, 1987. It was directed by Ichirō Itano, and features character designs by Nobuteru Yūki and a musical score by Shirō Sagisu. The anime is considerably condensed when compared to its manga source material, making many characters seem out of place. The OVA was localized in English and released in North America by AnimEigo on VHS July 31, 1996 and on DVD September 23, 2003. The anime has been out-of-print in the region since 2011.

Plot
Riki Hyoudo is a high school karate prodigy who enjoys fighting challenges. At the same time, unbeknownst to him, he is the prophesied vessel of lord Byoudo, demon king of the Dark Realm, who learns his dark energy is empowering Hyoudo through a dimensional gate to produce a legendary warrior. Wanting to investigate this, Byoudo travels to Earth and supernaturally freezes the school to challenge Hyoudo. The boy defeats the demon's spirits, but is easily submitted himself by Byoudo, who reveals they are both the same being and, suspecting the prophecy to be a trap, fuses them together in Hyoudo's body to absorb his power. Hyoudo believes the whole ordeal to be just a dream.

Shortly after, Space-Time Continuum Inspector Zankan arrives to Earth after detecting demonic activity, and he witnesses a young man with spiritual powers, Toshimitsu Yuuki, fighting and destroying man-possessing monsters. Next day, Yuuki ambushes Hyoudo, feeling the dark energy inside him and wrongly believing him to be the master of the demons, and it takes Byoudo's power to stop him. Byoudo has deduced the culprit is his own demon lieutenant, Fairy Master Kain, who has secretly betrayed him, and proposes Yuuki to team up in order to defeat her and her servants. Meanwhile, Kain deceives Megumi Koyama, a girl with an unrequited love for Hyoudo, and uses her emotions to create a demon and attack Hyoudo's close friend Ryouko Takayanagi. Zakan saves Takayanagi and interrogates her about Hyoudo, after which the latter uses his power to make her forget the encounter.

Zankan meets Hyoudo and allies temporally with him after a friendly spar, while Kain visits Yuuki in his shrine and possesses him. During a school event, Hyoudo saves Megumi from demon-possessed students, but she is also infected by a demon and he is forced spend a lot of energy to destroy and resurrect her. At the same time, Zankan is attacked by Yuuki-Kain, who defeats him and is about to kill him before Hyoudo intervenes. Hyoudo and Kain face off, wrecking the school in the process, and although Kain has the upper hand, Byoudo manages to take over momentarily and destroy her. After the battle, with Zankan's memory of the events erased, everything returns to normal.

Credits

Additional voices
English: J. David Arnold, Scott Simpson, Ralph Brownewell, Noah Shane

Crew
Producers: Sakamoto Seiichi (TOKUMA JAPAN) and Miyashita Kenji (DAST)
Director: Itano Ichiroo
Original Story, Screenplay, Storyboards: Itano Ichiroo
Music: Sagisu Shiroo
Character Design, Animation Direction: Yuuki Nobuteru
Assistant Animation Directors: Urushibara Tomoshi, Niioka Hiromi, Oogami Hiroaki, Anno Hideaki

Ending Theme: "Medusa"
Lyrics: Sugimoto Yuuri
Music: Matsumoto Takahiro
Arrangement: Oda Tetsuroo and Matsumoto Takahiro By Tokuma Japan Communications

Reception

References

External links 
 

1986 manga
1987 anime OVAs
Martial arts anime and manga
Shōnen manga